The Archangel Gabriel is a 1634 painting by Francisco de Zurbarán, now in the Musée Fabre in Montpellier.

References

Paintings by Francisco de Zurbarán
1634 paintings
Paintings in the collection of the Musée Fabre
Paintings depicting Gabriel